The 2022–23 Deportivo Toluca F.C. season is the 106th season in the football club's history and the 62nd consecutive season in the top flight of Mexican football. Toluca will compete in Liga MX.

Players

Squad information

First-team squad

Transfers

Transfers out

Pre-season and friendlies

Matches

Competitions

Overview

Liga MX

Torneo Apertura

League table

Results summary

Results round by round

Matches

Reclassification

Quarter-finals

Semi-finals

Final

Torneo Clausura

League table

Results summary

Results round by round

Squad statistics

Goalscorers
Includes all competitive matches.

Clean sheets
The list is sorted by shirt number when total clean sheets are equal. Numbers in parentheses represent games where both goalkeepers participated and both kept a clean sheet; the number in parentheses is awarded to the goalkeeper who was substituted on, whilst a full clean sheet is awarded to the goalkeeper who was on the field at the start of play.

References

External links

Toluca
Deportivo Toluca F.C. seasons